Omnivoropterygidae (meaning "omnivorous wings") is a family of primitive avialans known exclusively from the Jiufotang Formation of China, though putative omnivoropterygids are known from the Maevarano Formation of the Maastrichtian of Madagascar. They had short skeletal tails and unusual skulls with teeth in the upper, but not lower, jaws. Their unique dentition has led some scientists to suggest an omnivorous diet for them. The family was named by Stephen A. Czerkas & Qiang Ji in 2002, though its junior synonym Sapeornithidae is often used instead, though it was named four years later in 2006. It is the only named family in the order Omnivoropterygiformes.

References

Prehistoric avialans
Aptian first appearances
Aptian extinctions
Prehistoric dinosaur families
Taxa named by Qiang Ji (paleontologist)